Honey, I Shrunk the Kids is an American media franchise consisting of a series of family-science fiction-comedy films and a television adaptation, among other works, based on a concept created by Stuart Gordon and Brian Yuzna, and an original story co-written by Gordon, Yuzna, and Ed Naha. Following the release of Honey, I Shrunk the Kids (1989), and its subsequent financial and critical success, two sequels and a television series followed; titled Honey, I Blew Up the Kid (1992), Honey, We Shrunk Ourselves (1997), and Honey, I Shrunk the Kids: The TV Show, respectively. Another sequel titled Shrunk entered development in 2019.

The film series expanded into a franchise with the addition of a TV show. This continued in 1999 when the Honey, I Shrunk the Kids films, along with a number of other Disney film series, were combined into a franchise as a part of Disney Parks' attractions where elements from each movie were included.

Film

Honey, I Shrunk the Kids (1989)

Rick Moranis stars as Wayne Szalinski, an eccentric inventor who accidentally shrinks his kids, Amy (Amy O'Neill) and Nick (Robert Oliveri) as well as the next-door neighbor's sons, Russ Jr. (Thomas Wilson Brown) and Ron Thompson (Jared Rushton). Marcia Strassman portrays his wife, Diane, to whom he delivers the titular line. Matt Frewer and Kristine Sutherland also star as Russ and Mae Thompson, Russ Jr. and Ron's parents.

Honey, I Blew Up the Kid (1992)

Three years after the events of the first film, the Szalinskis have moved to a new neighborhood and given birth to their third child, Adam (Joshua and Daniel Shalikar). Nick is now a teenager and Amy is heading off to college. Wayne has given up his shrink ray days and invented an alternative which makes objects grow in size. One day when Adam is exposed to its effects, he mistakes Nick and his crush, Mandy Park (Keri Russell), as toys and wanders into Las Vegas. While Wayne and Diane race to reverse his effects, Wayne's insolent coworker, Dr. Charles Hendrickson (John Shea), has overpowered Sterling Labs, rounded up the military, and ordered Adam to be stopped at all costs.

Honey, We Shrunk Ourselves (1997)

Wayne is now banned from using his shrink ray by the committee of the U.S. Food and Drug Administration (FDA) and Diane (Eve Gordon). Nick is now away at college and Adam (Bug Hall) is ten years old. Diane is planning a vacation with her sister-in-law, Patti (Robin Bartlett), while Wayne and his brother, Gordon (Stuart Pankin), watch Adam and his cousins, Jenny and Mitch (Allison Mack and Jake Richardson). While tampering with the shrink ray, Wayne accidentally shrinks himself, Diane, Gordon, and Patti. The kids have a party in the house after thinking they have it to themselves. The adults struggle to get their attention before disaster strikes among them.

Shrunk (TBA)
In February 2018, a reboot film was in development, with the project being courted for a Disney+ exclusive. By March 2019, this changed when the project was announced to be a legacy sequel to the original trilogy. With The Walt Disney Studios developing the film for theatrical release, Josh Gad was announced to star as Nick Szalinski. The plot will reportedly center around Nick following in Wayne's footsteps and becoming a scientist and inventor. In the film, he accidentally shrinks his son and two daughters to five inches tall, leaving them to cope with their new sizes. By December, Joe Johnston had entered early negotiations to return to the franchise as director.

In January 2020, Rick Moranis entered early negotiations to come out of his acting retirement, and reprise his role as Wayne Szalinski. Johnston was confirmed to direct, with Todd Rosenberg set to write the script, from an original story by Gad, Ryan Dixon, Ian Helfer, and Jay Reiss. By February, Moranis had officially signed onto the project to reprise his role. David Hoberman and Todd Lieberman will serve as producers. The film will be a joint-venture production between Walt Disney Pictures and Mandeville Films, with Walt Disney Studios Motion Pictures as the distributing company. Principal photography was scheduled to begin in early 2020, with filming taking place in Toronto, as well as Atlanta, Georgia. In March of the same year, filming on all Disney projects were halted due to the COVID-19 pandemic and industry restrictions worldwide. In November, Disney CEO Bob Chapek announced that filming on all movies that had been postponed by the coronavirus had resumed. In June 2021, Gad stated that filming had not yet started and that he was hoping the shoot would begin in early 2022. In January 2022, Gad stated that he and Moranis had once again started collaborating in preparation for the sequel.

Television series

The television series, exclusive to the Disney Channel, expanded upon the original film's concept where a shrinking experiment had gone wrong, to include a variety of experiments malfunctioning and causing unfortunate circumstances for the Szalinskis. It debuted on September 1, 1997 and ran for three consecutive seasons. It concluded after the 66th episode aired on May 20, 2000. It was a joint-production between Plymouth Productions, St. Clare Entertainment, and Walt Disney Television; while Buena Vista Television distributed the show through the Disney Channel.

Theme park attractions

Honey, I Shrunk the Audience!

A 4-D movie-ride attraction titled Honey, I Shrunk the Audience debuted at Epcot in 1994 and featured at the Disney theme parks until 2010. Rick Moranis, Marcia Strassman, Robert Oliveri, and Daniel and Joshua Shalikar reprise their roles from the feature-length films. While being given an award by Dr. Nigel Channing (Eric Idle) about his shrink ray, Wayne accidentally shrinks the audience and sends them on an adventure with rats, snakes, and babies.

Journey into Imagination with Figment

In 1999, the theme of Journey into Imagination was changed and retitled to include Figment. It features Dr. Nigel Channing, from Honey, I Shrunk the Audience!, who "hosts" an area known as the Imagination Institute. The story states that his grandfather established the institute, while the area features references to Wayne Szalinski, as well as Dr. Philip Brainard from Flubber and Dean Higgins (Joe Flynn's role in the Dexter Riley films). Walt Disney and Thomas Edison also make an appearance.

Honey, I Shrunk the Kids: Movie Set Adventure

The attraction was a playground area at Disney's Hollywood Studios, designed to look like the outdoor backyard of the first film. It closed in 2016.

Main cast and characters

Additional crew and production details

Reception

Box office performance

Critical and public response

References 

 
Walt Disney Studios (division) franchises
Science fiction comedy
Films adapted into television shows
Trilogies
Film series introduced in 1989